The Palitana–Sihor section belongs to  division of Western Railway zone in Gujarat State.

History

Palitana–Sihor section was opened in 1910. The length of Palitana–Sihor section was 27.62 km. Palitana–Sihor section was opened again after Meter gauge to Broad gauge conversion in 2005.

References

5 ft 6 in gauge railways in India
Railway lines in Gujarat